Andrea Olga Færseth (born 23 May 1975) is an Icelandic former multi-sport athlete. She was a member of the Icelandic national teams in both football and basketball. In 1994, Olga won the national championship and national cup in both football and basketball.

Football

Club career
Olga started her senior career with Keflavík in 1991 but moved to Breiðablik in 1992 where she became Icelandic champion in 1992 and 1994. In 1995 she joined KR where she became Icelandic champion three years in a row (1997-1999). She is the leading scorer in the Icelandic women's top division, scoring 269 goals in 217 games.

International career
Olga played 54 games for the Icelandic national football team, scoring 14 goals.

Honours

Club
 Úrvalsdeild: 1992, 1994, 1997, 1998, 1999, 2002
 Icelandic Women's Cup: 1994, 1999, 2002, 2004, 2007, 2008

Individual
 Úrvalsdeild player of the year: 1998, 2001
 Icelandic Footballer of the Year: 2001
 Úrvalsdeild top goal scorer: 1994, 1997, 1998, 2000, 2001, 2002

Basketball

Club career
Olga played for five seasons in the Icelandic top-tier league, winning the national championship four times. She was voted the domestic player of the year in 1994 and was twice selected for the domestic All-first team, in 1993 and 1994. In 1994 she set a finals record by scoring 111 points in the finals series (22.2 points per game). The record stood for 22 years until it was broken by Haiden Denise Palmer in 2016. She spent the 1995-96 season in United States, playing for Brewton–Parker College in Georgia. After tearing a cruciate ligament in her knee in 1996 she decided to retire from basketball an focus solely on football.

International career
Between 1991 and 1994, Olga played 16 games for the Icelandic national basketball team. She was a member of the team that won bronze at the 1993 Games of the Small States of Europe in Malta.

Honours

Club
 Icelandic champion: 1992, 1993, 1994, 1995
 Icelandic Basketball Cup: 1993, 1994

Individual
 Úrvalsdeild Domestic Player of the Year (1994)
 Úrvalsdeild Domestic All-First Team (1993, 1994)

References

1975 births
Living people
Olga Faerseth
Olga Faerseth
Olga Faerseth
Olga Faerseth
Olga Faerseth
Olga Faerseth
Olga Faerseth
Olga Faerseth
Women's association football forwards
Olga Faerseth
Olga Faerseth
Olga Faerseth
Olga Faerseth
Olga Faerseth
Guards (basketball)